"Just a Friend of Mine" is the first single by the Belgian band Vaya Con Dios. It was released in 1987 by Ariola Records and later included in the band's debut album Vaya Con Dios.

Track listings
 7" single
A. "Just a Friend of Mine" (3:20)
B. "You Let Me Down" (2:34)
 Written by Al Dubin and Warren Harry

 12" single
A. "Just a Friend of Mine" (Long Version) (6:01)
B1. "Just a Friend of Mine" (3:20)
B2. "You Let Me Down" (2:34)
 Written by Al Dubin and Warren Harry

Credits
 Written by Dani Shoovaerts, Dirk Shoufs, Willy Lambregt
 Produced by Phil Gosez

Charts

In France the single has sold over 300,000 copies.

References

External links
Just a Friend of Mine at Discogs

1990 singles
Vaya Con Dios (band) songs
Songs written by Dani Klein
1988 songs
Ariola Records singles